The 1996 UEFA European Football Championship, commonly referred to as Euro 96, was the 10th UEFA European Championship, a quadrennial football tournament contested by European nations and organised by UEFA. It took place in England from 8 to 30 June 1996. It was the first European Championship to feature 16 finalists, following UEFA's decision to expand the tournament from eight teams.

Matches were staged in eight cities and, although not all games were sold out, the tournament holds the European Championship's second-highest aggregate attendance (1,276,000) and average per game (41,158) for the 16-team format, surpassed only in 2012. 

The tournament was the first European Championship where three points were awarded for a win during the qualification and finals group stages, as opposed to the old system of two points for a win, reflecting the growing use of this system in domestic leagues throughout the world during the previous decade.

Germany won the tournament, beating the Czech Republic 2–1 in the final with a golden goal from Oliver Bierhoff during extra time; this was the first major competition to be decided using this method. This was also Germany's first major title won as a unified nation, adding to the two European Championship titles won by West Germany prior to reunification.

Bid process
At the time of the bidding process, it had not yet been confirmed that 16 teams would be participating. Instead, the bids were largely prepared as if hosting an eight-team tournament, meaning only four venues were due to be required. All candidates had to submit their plans by 10 December 1991.

The hosting of the event was contested by five bids: Austria, England, Greece, the Netherlands and Portugal. The English bid was selected by the UEFA Executive Committee at a meeting in Lisbon on 5 May 1992. In the year preceding the decision, the English FA had dropped plans to also bid for the 1998 World Cup in order to gain the support of other UEFA members who were planning to bid for that event.

Summary

Group matches
The hosts, England, drew 1–1 with Switzerland in the opening match of Group A when Alan Shearer's 23rd-minute goal was cancelled out by a late Kubilay Türkyilmaz penalty kick. England defeated rivals Scotland 2–0 in their next game, and then produced one of their finest performances ever with a 4–1 win over the Netherlands. Patrick Kluivert's late goal for the Netherlands secured his team second place in the group and ensured that Scotland would exit another major competition on tie-breaking criteria.

Group B had Western European France and Spain, along with Balkan World Cup participants Romania and Bulgaria. France and Spain dominated the group, with France avenging Bulgaria for the 1994 qualification debacle, and World Cup quarter-finalists Romania going home, with no points and only one goal scored.

Groups C and D saw the Czech Republic and Croatia, whose national teams had only recently come into existence, qualify for the knockout stage. The Czechs lost to Germany, the eventual group winners, in their opener, but then defeated Italy and drew with Russia. Italy's defeat meant they had to beat Germany in their final game to progress, but the World Cup finalists could only manage a 0–0 draw and were eliminated. In Group D, Croatia qualified for the quarter-finals, with wins over Turkey (1–0) and Denmark (3–0). The loss to the Croats ultimately sent the Danes, the surprise champions of 1992, home. Turkey became the first team since the introduction of a group stage to be eliminated without gaining a point or scoring a goal.

The other three quarter-finalists were Portugal (whose "Golden Generation" was competing at its first major tournament), Spain, and a France team featuring a young Zinedine Zidane.

Quarter-finals and semi-finals
The knockout stage was characterised by negative, defensive play; as a result, only nine goals were scored in the seven games and four of the matches were decided on penalties. The first quarter-final between the hosts and Spain ended goalless, after Spain had two goals disallowed and two claims for a penalty denied. The English progressed 4–2 on spot kicks. France and Netherlands also played out a 0–0 draw, with France winning the penalty shootout 5–4. Jürgen Klinsmann opened the scoring for Germany in their match against Croatia. A goal from Davor Šuker evened the score after 51 minutes, before Matthias Sammer of Germany scored eight minutes later, and the game ended 2–1 to Germany. Czech Republic progressed after beating Portugal 1–0.

The first semi-final, featuring France and Czech Republic, resulted in another 0–0 draw and penalties. Reynald Pedros was the one player to miss in the shootout, as Czech Republic won the penalty shoot-out 6–5. The other semi-final was a repeat of the 1990 World Cup semi-final between Germany and England. Alan Shearer headed in after three minutes to give his side the lead, but Stefan Kuntz evened the score less than 15 minutes later, and the score remained 1–1 after 90 minutes. In extra time, Paul Gascoigne came very close to scoring a golden goal, but fractionally missed a cross from Shearer in front of the empty goal, Darren Anderton hit the post, and Kuntz had a goal disallowed for pushing. Neither team was able to find a second goal. In penalties, both sides scored their first five kicks, but in the sixth round, Gareth Southgate had his penalty saved, allowing Andreas Möller to score the winning goal.

Final match
The final saw the Czech Republic hoping to repeat Euro 1976 when Czechoslovakia defeated West Germany; the Germans were aiming to win their third European Championship. Patrik Berger scored from a penalty in 59th minute to put the Czechs ahead. German substitute Oliver Bierhoff scored in the 73rd minute to make it 1–1. Five minutes into extra time, Bierhoff's shot was mishandled by Czech goalkeeper Kouba and the ball ended up in the back of the net for the first golden goal in the history of the competition. Germany were European champions again, but for the first time as a unified country.

Qualification

On 30 November 1992, UEFA formally decided to expand the tournament to sixteen teams. UEFA cited the increased number of international teams following the recent break up of the Soviet Union and of Yugoslavia – rising from 33 UEFA members in 1988 to 48 by 1994 – as a driving factor behind the expansion. Forty-seven teams ultimately entered to compete for the fifteen remaining places in the finals, alongside hosts England.

The draw for the qualifying competition took place in Manchester on 22 January 1994. The teams were divided into eight groups, each containing either six or five teams. The qualifying process began in April 1994 and concluded in December 1995. At the conclusion of the qualifying group stage in November 1995, the eight group winners qualified automatically, along with the six highest-ranked second-placed teams. The remaining two second-placed teams, the Netherlands and the Republic of Ireland, contested a one-off play-off match in England to decide the final qualifier.

Qualified teams
With the extended format, three teams were able to qualify for their first European Championship: Bulgaria, Switzerland and Turkey. Croatia, the Czech Republic and Russia competed for the first time in their own right since the dissolution of Yugoslavia, Czechoslovakia and the Soviet Union (though the Russian team is considered by FIFA to be the direct descendant of the Soviet Union and CIS teams that had appeared in six past tournaments and the Czech team is the descendant of the Czechoslovakia team). Seven of the eight participants at the previous tournament in 1992 were again present, with only Sweden – despite also having finished third in the World Cup two years earlier – missing out. Italy qualified after missing out Euro 1992 and Romania and Portugal after 12 years.

As of 2020, this was the last time that Sweden failed to qualify for the European Championship finals.

The following sixteen teams qualified for the finals:

Final draw
The draw for the final tournament took place on 17 December 1995 at the International Convention Centre in Birmingham. Only four teams were seeded: England (as hosts), Denmark (as holders), Spain and Germany (as the two highest ranked teams). The remaining twelve teams were all unseeded and could be drawn in any group.

Draw procedure:
 The unseeded teams were first drawn one by one without being revealed from Pot 2, and placed consecutively into four group bowls labelled I to IV. The teams drawn first, fifth and ninth were put into the Group I bowl; second, sixth and tenth were put into the Group II bowl; third, seventh and eleventh were put into the Group III bowl; and fourth, eighth and twelfth were put into the Group IV bowl.
 The team drawn first from each group bowl was placed into position 4 in their group; the team drawn second in position 3; and the team drawn third in position 2. 
 Finally, the four top-seeded teams were drawn from the separate Pot 1 bowl, and placed consecutively into position 1 of each group bowl. 
 While it was decreed in advance ahead of the draw, that England's group would be Group A (irrespective of their drawn group label), the remaining three groups then consecutively had the three remaining letters (B, C and D) drawn from yet another bowl to decide the letter name of their group, which also determined what venues they would play at.

The balls were drawn by UEFA figures Gerhard Aigner and Lennart Johansson.

The draw resulted in the following groups:

Venues
Since the implementation of the Taylor Report in 1990, following the 1989 Hillsborough stadium disaster, England now had enough all-seater stadia of sufficient capacity to hold an expanded tournament due to the necessary stadium refurbishment by its leading clubs. The stadium capacities listed in the table are for the time of the tournament.

Squads

Each national team had to submit a squad of 22 players, three of whom must be goalkeepers.

Finals format
To accommodate the expansion from an 8-team finals tournament to 16 teams, the format was changed from that used in 1992 with the addition of two extra groups in the group stage, and an extra round in the knockout phases. The four groups (A to D) still contained four teams each, with the top two from each group still going through to the knockout phase. 8 teams then went into the new quarter-finals, ahead of the usual semi-finals and final, with 8 teams going out at the group stage. The format is exactly the one which was applied to the 1958, 1962, 1966 and 1970 World Cups, except for the absence of a third place play-off.

Match ball

A custom version of the Adidas Questra, the Questra Europa, was the official match ball of the championships. The design of the ball included a reworking of the England badge, and was the first coloured ball in a major football tournament.

Match officials
Match officials are listed in the two collapsed tables below.

Group stage

The teams finishing in the top two positions in each of the four groups progress to the quarter-finals, while the bottom two teams in each group were eliminated from the tournament. For the first time at a European Championship three points were awarded for a win, with one for a draw and a none for a defeat.

All times are local, BST (UTC+1).

Tiebreakers
For the first time in the history of the European Championship, the position of teams tied on points was decided by their head-to-head record, and not goal difference. If two or more teams finished level on points after completion of the group matches, the following tie-breakers were used to determine the final ranking:

 Higher number of points obtained in the matches played between the teams in question;
 Superior goal difference resulting from the matches played between the teams in question (if more than two teams finish equal on points);
 Higher number of goals scored in the matches played between the teams in question (if more than two teams finish equal on points);
 If, after having applied criteria 1 to 3 to more than two teams, two teams still have an equal ranking, criteria 1 to 3 are reapplied exclusively to the matches between the two teams in question to determine the final rankings of the two teams. If this procedure does not lead to a decision, criteria 5 to 9 apply in the order given;
 Superior goal difference in all group matches;
 Higher number of goals scored in all group matches;
 Position using UEFA's national team coefficient ranking system calculated using average points per game from: the Euro 1992 qualifying stage and final tournament, the 1994 World Cup qualifying stage and final tournament and the Euro 1996 qualifying stage.
 Fair play conduct of the teams (final tournament);
 Drawing of lots.

Group A

Group B

Group C

Group D

Knockout stage

The knockout stage was a single-elimination tournament with each round eliminating the losers. Any game that was undecided by the end of the regular 90 minutes, was followed by up to thirty minutes of extra time. For the first time in a major football competition, the golden goal system was applied, whereby the first team to score during the extra time would become the winner. If no goal was scored there would be a penalty shoot-out to determine the winner. For the first time the final was won by a golden goal.

As with every tournament since UEFA Euro 1984, there was no third place play-off.

All times are local, BST (UTC+1).

Bracket

Quarter-finals

Semi-finals

Final

Statistics

Goalscorers

Awards
Team of the Tournament

Golden Boot
Alan Shearer was awarded the Golden Boot award, after scoring five goals in the group stage and in the semi-finals against Germany.
 Alan Shearer (5 goals)

UEFA Player of the Tournament
 Matthias Sammer

Marketing

Slogan and theme songs
The competition slogan was Football Comes Home reflecting that the sport's rules were first standardised in the United Kingdom. UEFA President Lennart Johansson had said that the organisation had felt it was time to bring the event "back to the motherland of football".

The slogan was incorporated into the competition's most popular song: "Three Lions" recorded by comedians David Baddiel and Frank Skinner with Britpop band the Lightning Seeds. Baddiel and Skinner were then strongly connected with football owing to their BBC show Fantasy Football League. Released as a single, the song topped the UK Singles Chart for a total of two weeks. It was promoted by a video featuring the England squad.

The song was prominently sung by England fans during all their games, and was also chanted by the German team upon parading the trophy in Berlin after the tournament. It was even referenced by future Prime Minister Tony Blair in an address at the 1996 Labour Party Conference with the line: "Seventeen years of hurt, never stopped us dreaming, Labour's coming home".

"Three Lions" was the official song of the England team, and is the song most strongly connected with the tournament, however the official song of the tournament was "We're in This Together" by Simply Red. The song was performed at the tournament's opening ceremony.

Merchandise and mascots
The British Royal Mint issued a commemorative £2 coin in 1996, which featured a representation of a football, "1996" in the centre, and 16 small rings representing the 16 competing teams. Further special coins were only issued in the Isle of Man and Gibraltar.

The official mascot, 'Goaliath', was designed in a similar fashion to the original World Cup mascot from the 1966 World Cup. Goaliath comprised a lion, the image on the English team crest, dressed in an England football strip and football boots whilst holding a football under his right arm.

Sponsorship

Controversies

Terrorist attack
A terrorist attack took place in Manchester on 15 June, one day before the group stage match between Germany and Russia was due to take place in the same city. The detonation of a van bomb in the city centre injured 212 people and caused an estimated £700 million worth of damage. Four days after the blast, the Provisional Irish Republican Army issued a statement in which it claimed responsibility, but regretted causing injury to civilians.

The Manchester bombing was the first and so far only major terrorist attack in the host city of an ongoing UEFA European Championship. The scheduled match at Old Trafford on the day following the bombing went ahead as planned after the stadium had been heavily guarded overnight and carefully searched; the game, in which Germany defeated Russia 3–0, was watched by a near capacity crowd of 50,700.

Empty seats
The aggregate attendance of 1,276,000 and average attendance of 41,158 per game were the highest for the European Championship (in its 16-team format) until the 2012 tournament.  However, these numbers were based on the number of tickets sold rather than the number of spectators in the ground, which was often significantly lower. The large number of empty seats in most of the games not involving England was blamed on a number of factors: a lack of travelling fans from most of the other nations concerned, a lack of interest among locals for games not involving England, kick-offs before 5:00pm that made it hard for children at school and adults at work to attend, steep ticket prices, and UEFA's policy of only selling tickets in blocks (where each block consisted of a set from each of three price bands).

Disorder
After England's defeat to Germany in the semi-finals, a large-scale riot took place in Trafalgar Square and the surrounding area. Further outbreaks of trouble occurred in the streets of several other towns. The police and German-made cars were targeted, with damage also caused to various other properties. A Russian student was stabbed in Brighton after attackers mistook him for being German.

Despite this outbreak, the tournament overall was free of hooliganism, helping rehabilitate England's reputation after their fans' conduct during the previous decades. UEFA's awarding of the tournament to England was in itself a further step in bringing the country back fully into the international fold, coming soon after their decision in 1990 to re-admit English clubs back into UEFA competitions after the indefinite ban issued to them following the Heysel Stadium disaster in 1985.

Notes

References

External links

 UEFA Euro 1996 at UEFA.com

 
1996
1995–96 in European football
1995–96 in English football
1996
June 1996 sports events in Europe